DICT is a dictionary network protocol created by the DICT Development Group in 1997, described by RFC 2229. Its goal is to surpass the Webster protocol to allow clients to access a variety of dictionaries via a uniform interface.

In section 3.2 of the DICT protocol RFC, queries and definitions are sent in clear-text, meaning that there is no encryption. Nevertheless, according to section 3.1 of the RFC, various forms of authentication (sans encryption) are supported, including Kerberos version 4.

The protocol consists of a few commands a server must recognize so a client can access the available data and lookup word definitions. DICT servers and clients use TCP port 2628 by default. Queries are captured in the following URL scheme:dict://<user>;<auth>@<host>:<port>/<c>:<word>:<database>:<strategy>:<n>

Resources for free dictionaries from DICT protocol servers
A repository of source files for the DICT Development group's dict protocol server (with a few sample dictionaries) is available online.

Dictionaries of English
 Bouvier's Law Dictionary, Revised 6th Ed (1856)
 CIA World Factbook
 Easton's Bible Dictionary (1897)
 Elements database
 Free On-line Dictionary of Computing
 Hitchcock's Bible Names Dictionary
 Jargon File
 Moby Thesaurus
 Oxford Advanced Learner's Dictionary
 The Devil's Dictionary (1911)
 The U.S. Gazetteer (1990 Census)
 V.E.R.A. – Virtual Entity of Relevant Acronyms which are used in the field of computing
 Webster's Revised Unabridged Dictionary (1913)
 WordNet

Bilingual dictionaries
 Big English–Russian Dictionary
 English–French dictionary
 Freedict provides a collection of over 85 translating dictionaries, as XML source files with the data, mostly accompanied by databases generated from the XML files in the format used by DICT servers and clients. These are available from the Freedict project web site at.
 FREELANG Dictionary
 Lingvo English–Russian and Russian–English dictionaries are not free, but when purchased, can easily be converted into DICT format
 Mueller's English–Russian dictionary
 Slovak-English legal dictionary
 Slovak-Italian legal dictionary

DICT servers
 dictd (the standard server made by the DICT Development Group)
 DictD++ – modern powerful server written in C++ with heavy usage of STL and boost
 GNU Dico
 JDictd – a Java-based DICT server implementation (abandoned)

DICT clients 
A dictd server can be used from Telnet. For example, to connect to the DICT server on localhost, on a Unix system one can normally type:

 telnet localhost dict

and then enter the command "help" to see the available commands.  The standard dictd package also provides a "dict" command for command-line use.

More sophisticated DICT clients include:
 cURL
 dictc (DICT Client) client for Windows written in Delphi.
 dict.org's own client (part of the dictd package)
 dictem, for the Emacs text editor
 Dictionary, an application included with Mac OS X. Online dictionaries can be accessed by setting it as the helper for 'dict://' URI schemes.
 Fantasdic
 GNOME Dictionary, comes with GNOME
 GNU dico's own client (part of the dico package)
 Kdict, comes with KDE
 KTranslator, KDE dictionary
 MaemoDict, for the Nokia 770
 MATE Dictionary (with accompanying applet)
 Mozdev.org's 'dict', a Firefox/Mozilla extension
 OKDict, an OpenOffice.org extension
 OmniDictionary, for Mac OS X
 StarDict
 ZopeDictDB for Zope from Pentila
 GoldenDict
 xfce4-dict, from the Xfce project

There are also programs that read the DICT file format directly. For example, S60Dict, is a dictionary program for Symbian Series 60 that uses DICT dictionaries. Additionally, some DICT clients, such as Fantasdic, are also capable of reading the DICT format directly.

Dict file format

The standard dictd server made by the DICT Development Group uses a special dict file format. It comprises two files, a .index file and a .dict file (or .dict.dz if compressed).  These files are usually generated by a program called dictfmt. For example, the Unix command: dictfmt --utf8 --allchars -s "My Dictionary" -j mydict < mydict.txt
will compile a Unicode-compatible DICT file called mydict, with heading My Dictionary, from mydict.txt which is in Jargon File format i.e.:

 :word1:definition 1
 :word2:definition 2
 etc.

Once the dictionary file has been produced, it can be easily installed on a server with commands similar to this:

 mv mydict.dict mydict.index /usr/share/dictd/
 /usr/sbin/dictdconfig—write
 /etc/init.d/dictd restart

Format converters 
 Linguae Software is able to convert from/to wb, dict (stardict and dictd) csv, xdxf, txt, ini and ling (native) file formats, Linux, Windows and Mac OS X.
 XDXF XML Dictionary Exchange Format converts between various dictionary formats using pluggable codec architecture.

dictzip 
In order to efficiently store dictionary data, dictzip, an extension to the gzip compression format (also the name of the utility), can be used to compress a .dict file.
Dictzip compresses file in chunks and stores the chunk index in the gzip file header, thus allowing random access to the data.

See also
 DICT clients

References

External links
 RFC 2229 – Definition of the DICT protocol
 dict.org DICT Development Group. A WWW interface to several freely available on-line dictionaries.
 DICT protocol server list by the FreeDict project

Internet protocols